Wola Wołodzka  , Volia Volods’ka) is a village in the administrative district of Gmina Nozdrzec, within Brzozów County, Podkarpackie Voivodeship, in south-eastern Poland.

References

Villages in Brzozów County